Jurevičius is a Lithuanian language family name. It may refer to:
Joe Jurevicius, American footballer
Nathan Jurevicius, Australian artist
Jonas Jurevicius, Juzė Jurevičienė Lithuanian Righteous Among the Nations
Inesa Jurevičiūtė, Lithianian figure skater
Lina Jurevičiūtė, 2007 entry of Lithuania in the Junior Eurovision Song Contest

Lithuanian-language surnames
Patronymic surnames